Bermudez or the accented Bermúdez is a Spanish patronymic surname meaning "son of Bermudo". It may refer to:

 A. J. Bermudez, American author and screenwriter
 Adolfo Bermudez, American professional wrestler
Aira Bermudez (born 1983), Filipina dancer and actress
 Alejandro Bermúdez (born 1975), Colombian swimmer
Andrés Bermúdez Viramontes (1950–2009), Mexican businessman and politician
 Angel Bermudez (born 1950/1951), Aruban politician
Antonio J. Bermúdez (1892–1977), Mexican businessman and politician
Beatriz Bermúdez de Velasco, Spanish soldier during the Spanish Conquest of Mexico
Carlos Alberto Arroyo Bermúdez (born 1979), Puerto Rican basketball player
 Carolina Bermudez (born 1978), Nicaraguan-American radio personality 
Christian Bermúdez (born 1987), known as "El Hobbit", Mexican football (soccer) player 
Christopher Bermudez (born 1999), American football (soccer) player 
Chuny Bermúdez (born 1970), Spanish sports sailor 
 Claudio Bermúdez (born 1971), Mexican singer and composer
Cristian Bermúdez (born 1973), Guatemalan sports shooter
Cristina Bermúdez (c. 982–1051/1067), daughter of King Bermudo II of León
Cundo Bermúdez (1914–2008), Cuban painter
Daniel Bermúdez (born 1950), Colombian architect and professor 
Daniela Romina Bermúdez (born 1989), Argentine boxer
 Dennis Bermudez (born 1986), American mixed martial artist
Diego Bermúdez (footballer) (born 1982), Spanish football (soccer) player
Diego Bermúdez (singer) (1850–1923), known as "el Tenazas", Spanish flamenco singer
 Edouard Bermudez (1832–1892), Chief Justice of the Louisiana Supreme Court 
Eduard Bermúdez (born 1984), Venezuelan boxer 
 Enrique Bermúdez (1932–1991), commander of the Nicaraguan Contras
Erandi Bermúdez (born 1977), Mexican politician
Evelyn Nazarena Bermúdez (born 1996), Argentine boxer
Fernando Antonio Bermúdez Arias (1933– 2007), Venezuelan medical doctor and writer
Fernando Bermudez (born 1969), wrongfully convicted man and motivational speaker
Fernando Bermúdez de Cea (died c. 978), 2nd Count of Cea, nobleman of the Kingdom of León
Francisco Bermúdez de Pedraza (1585–1655), Spanish writer, jurist and historian
Francisco Cea Bermúdez (1779–1850), Spanish diplomat and politician
 Francisco Morales-Bermúdez (born 1921), Peruvian Army general
Guillermo Bermúdez (1924–1995), Colombian architect and university professor
 Gustavo Bermúdez (born 1964), Argentine actor
Jaime Bermúdez (born c. 1966), Colombian politician and diplomat
 Jerónimo Bermúdez (1530–1599), Spanish poet and playwright
Jesús Bermúdez (1902–1945), Bolivian football (soccer) player
Jimmy Bermúdez (born 1987), Colombian football (soccer) player
 Jorge Bermúdez (born 1971), Colombian football (soccer) player
 José Armando Bermúdez (1871–1941), Dominican Republic businessman
 José Francisco Bermúdez (1782–1831), Venezuelan military officer, leader in the Venezuelan War of Independence
José Manuel Bermúdez (born 1958), Spanish rower
José María Bermúdez (born 1975), Nicaraguan football (soccer) player
José Miguel Bermúdez (born 1979), known as "José", Spanish football (soccer) player
 Juan de Bermúdez (died 1570), Spanish explorer, after whom Bermuda is named
 Juan Agustín Ceán Bermúdez  (1749–1829), Spanish writer on art
Julissa Bermúdez (born 1983), Dominican-American television host, actress, dancer, model and singer
Karol Bermúdez (born 2001), Uruguayan football (soccer) player
 Lía Bermúdez (1930–2021), Venezuelan sculptor
Lucho Bermúdez (1912–1994), Colombian musician and composer
Manny Bermudez (born 1994), American mixed martial artist
Manuel Bermúdez de Castro y Díez (1811–1870), Spanish economist and politician
 Manuel Octavio Bermúdez (born 1961), Colombian serial killer
Mariluz Bermúdez, Costa Rican television actress and model
Martín Bermúdez (born 1958), Mexican race walker
 Miguel Mario Díaz-Canel Bermúdez (born 1960), President of Cuba
Noelia Bermúdez (born 1994), Costa Rican football (soccer) player
Nuria Bermúdez (born 1980), Spanish football (soccer) agent and actress
 Obie Bermúdez (born 1981), a Puerto Rican salsa singer and composer
Ordoño Bermúdez (fl. 1001–1042), illegitimate son of King Bermudo II of León
Patricia Bermúdez (born 1987), Argentine freestyle wrestler
Pedro Pablo Bermúdez (1793–1852), Peruvian military man and politician
 Poppy Bermúdez (1928–2014), Dominican Republic businessman, grandson of José Armando Barmúdez
Rafael Bermúdez (born 1978), Uruguayan football (soccer) player
Sonia Bermúdez (born 1984), Spanish football (soccer) player
Vicente Bermúdez Zacarías (c.1978–2016), Mexican federal judge, victim of murder
Violeta Bermúdez (born 1961), Peruvian lawyer, diplomat and politician
Yeniel Bermúdez (born 1985 ), Cuban football (soccer) player

Spanish-language surnames
Patronymic surnames
Surnames from given names